Treyson Thomas Supak (born May 31, 1996) is an American professional baseball pitcher in the Oakland Athletics organization. He was drafted by the Pittsburgh Pirates in the second round of the 2014 Major League Baseball draft.

Career

Pittsburgh Pirates
Supak attended La Grange High School in La Grange, Texas. He was drafted by the Pittsburgh Pirates in the second round of the 2014 Major League Baseball Draft. Supak signed with the Pirates on June 13 for a bonus of $1 million. He made his professional debut for the rookie ball GCL Pirates, and recorded a 4.88 ERA in 8 games for the team. He spent the 2015 season with the rookie ball Bristol Pirates, pitching to a 6.67 ERA with 23 strikeouts.

Milwaukee Brewers
On December 17, 2015, the Pirates traded Supak and Keon Broxton to the Milwaukee Brewers for Jason Rogers. Supak split the 2016 season between the rookie ball Helena Brewers and the Single-A Wisconsin Timber Rattlers, accumulating a 3-4 record and 3.24 ERA with 51 strikeouts between the two clubs. He split the 2017 season between the High-A Carolina Mudcats and Wisconsin, recording a 5-6 record and 3.57 ERA in 23 appearances. In 2018, Supak split the year between Carolina and the Double-A Biloxi Shuckers, pitching to an 8-7 record and 2.48 ERA with 123 strikeouts between the teams.

The Brewers added him to their 40-man roster after the 2018 season. Supak played in 7 games for the Triple-A San Antonio Missions in 2019, but struggled greatly, recording a 9.30 ERA in 7 appearances. He fared much better in Biloxi, pitching to a stellar 11-4 record and 2.20 ERA in 27 games.

Supak did not play in a game in 2020 due to the cancellation of the minor league season because of the COVID-19 pandemic. Supak was promoted to the major leagues on August 31, 2020, but was optioned down the next day without making an appearance. Supak was designated for assignment by the Brewers on September 14, 2020. On September 17, he cleared waivers and was outrighted to the Triple-A San Antonio Missions. On November 2, 2020, Supak elected free agency.

Oakland Athletics
On November 20, 2020, Supak signed a minor league contract with the Oakland Athletics organization. He was assigned to the Double-A Midland RockHounds to begin the 2021 season, but did not play in a game after undergoing Tommy John surgery. He elected free agency following the season on November 7, but re-signed with the Athletics on a new minor league contract on November 15, 2021.

References

External links

Living people
1996 births
Baseball pitchers
Baseball players from Texas
Minor league baseball players
Gulf Coast Pirates players
Bristol Pirates players
Helena Brewers players
Wisconsin Timber Rattlers players
Carolina Mudcats players
Biloxi Shuckers players
San Antonio Missions players
People from Bryan, Texas